Centrolepis milleri is a species of plant in the Restionaceae family and is found in Western Australia.

The annual herb is found in two small areas in Wheatbelt near Dandaragan and in the Great Southern near Albany.

References

milleri
Plants described in 2015
Flora of Western Australia
Poales of Australia
Taxa named by Matthew David Barrett